Martin Lewis, (born 8 September 1888 – died 1 April 1970), was an English actor. He has appeared in various films and shows including The Stronger Sex, The Riverside Murder, The Heirloom Mystery and the series Emergency-Ward 10. On stage, he played Dr. Bradman in the original West End production of Noël Coward's Blithe Spirit in 1941.

Selected filmography
 Greek Street (1930)
 The Stronger Sex (1931)
 Dangerous Ground (1934)
 The Heirloom Mystery (1936)

References

External links

English male film actors
1888 births
1970 deaths
People from Blackheath, London
Male actors from London
Male actors from Kent
20th-century English male actors